Lowndes County Courthouse may refer to:

Lowndes County Courthouse (Alabama), Haynesville, Alabama
Lowndes County Courthouse (Georgia), Valdosta, Georgia
Lowndes County Courthouse (Mississippi), Columbus, Mississippi